Freind is a surname, and may refer to:

Sir John Freind (conspirator) (died 1696), executed English civil servant
John Freind (physician) (1675–1728), English physician
John Freind (priest) (1754–1832) English Archdeacon of Armagh
Robert Freind (1667–1751), English educator
Stephen Freind (born 1944), American politician
William Freind (c. 1715 – 1766), Church of England clergyman

See also
 Friend
 Friend (disambiguation)
 Frend (disambiguation)